Building regulations may refer to:

 Building code, a set of rules that specify the minimum acceptable level of safety for constructed objects
 Planning permission, the permission required to develop or modify land and buildings
 Building regulations in the United Kingdom, statutory instruments that seek to ensure that the policies set out in the Building Act 1984